Angka may refer to:
Angka (spider), a spider genus
Communist Party of Kampuchea, also called Angka or Angkar